Westphalweg is a Berlin U-Bahn station located on the .

Designed by Rümmler, the station was opened in 1966. In 1969, the first ticket machines were set up in this station.

References

U6 (Berlin U-Bahn) stations
Buildings and structures in Tempelhof-Schöneberg
Railway stations in Germany opened in 1966